Jan Maarten Paternotte (born 26 February 1984) is a Dutch politician of the Democrats 66 (D66). He has been a member of the House of Representatives since 23 March 2017. On 11 January 2022, he succeeded Sigrid Kaag as the party's leader in the House of Representatives.

Early life and education 
Paternotte was born in 's-Hertogenbosch, North Brabant and grew up in the villages of Hurwenen, Maarssen and Groenekan. He studied international relations at the University of Amsterdam. In 2012, he obtained a degree in European law.

Career 
In 2004, Paternotte became the chair of the Young Democrats, a political youth organisation affiliated with D66. On 11 March 2010, he was elected into the municipal council of Amsterdam. In the same year, he participated in the 2010 Dutch general election as the twelfth candidate on the list of D66, but was not elected into the House of Representatives.

While a member of the municipal council, Paternotte worked as a policy advisor to MEP Marietje Schaake. In the 2014 Dutch municipal elections, he was the lead candidate for D66 in Amsterdam. Under his leadership, D66 became the largest party in the municipal council. Paternotte left the council in 2017, when he was elected into the House of Representatives. He was re-elected in 2021.

On 11 January 2022, he became the parliamentary leader of D66 in the House of Representatives, after both Sigrid Kaag and Rob Jetten joined the fourth Rutte cabinet as ministers.

Notes

References 

1984 births
21st-century Dutch politicians
Abortion-rights activists
Democrats 66 politicians
Living people
Members of the House of Representatives (Netherlands)
Municipal councillors of Amsterdam
People from 's-Hertogenbosch
People from De Bilt
People from Maarssen
People from Maasdriel
University of Amsterdam alumni
20th-century Dutch people